Kilian Frankiny (born 26 January 1994 in Reckingen) is a Swiss cyclist, who currently rides for UCI WorldTeam . He was named in the startlist for the 2017 Vuelta a España. In May 2018, he was named in the startlist for the 2018 Giro d'Italia.

Major results
2015
 4th Overall Giro della Valle d'Aosta
2016
 1st  Overall Giro della Valle d'Aosta
1st Stages 1 (TTT) & 4
 3rd Overall Peace Race U23
 7th Overall Tour de l'Ain
2017
 1st Stage 1 (TTT) Vuelta a España
 1st Stage 2 (TTT) Volta a Catalunya
 3rd Road race, National Road Championships
2018
 9th Overall Volta a la Comunitat Valenciana
1st  Young rider classification
1st Stage 3 (TTT)
2019
 6th Overall Tour du Haut Var
 7th Trofeo Laigueglia

Grand Tour general classification results timeline

References

External links 

1994 births
Living people
Swiss male cyclists
People from Goms District
Sportspeople from Valais